B97 may refer to :
 WEZB, an American radio station currently licensed to New Orleans, Louisiana
 WBFB, an American radio station licensed to Bangor, Maine formerly branded B97
 Bundesstraße 97, a German road
 Murauer Straße, an Austrian road
 Sicilian Defence, Najdorf Variation, according to the list of chess openings
 B97, a postcode district in the B postcode area